LGBT erasure (also known as queer erasure) refers to the tendency to remove lesbian, gay, bisexual, transgender, asexual and queer groups or people (i.e. the LGBT community) intentionally or unintentionally from record, or to dismiss or downplay their significance. This erasure can be found in a number of written and oral texts, including popular and scholarly texts.

In academia and media 
Queer historian Gregory Samantha Rosenthal refers to queer erasure in describing the exclusion of LGBT history from public history that can occur in urban contexts via gentrification. Rosenthal says this results in the "displacement of queer peoples from public view". Cáel Keegan describes the lack of appropriate and realistic representation of queer people, HIV-positive people, and queer people of color as being a type of aesthetic gentrification, where space is being appropriated from queer people's communities where queer people are not given any cultural representation.

Erasure of LGBT people has taken place in medical research and schools as well, such as in the case of AIDS research that does not include lesbian populations. Medicine and academia can be places where visibility is produced or erased, such as the exclusion of gay and bisexual women in HIV discourses and studies or the lack of attention to LGBT identities in dealing with anti-bullying discourse in schools.

Straightwashing 

Straightwashing is a form of queer erasure that refers to the portrayal of LGBT people, fictional characters, or historical figures as heterosexual. It is most prominently seen in works of fiction, whereby characters who were originally portrayed as or intended to be homosexual, bisexual, or asexual are misrepresented as heterosexual.

Bisexual erasure 

Bisexual erasure refers to attempts to ignore or re-explain evidence of bisexuality and may include the belief that bisexuality does not exist, or is simply a phase. Bisexual erasure often causes struggles for bisexuals even from within LGBT communities.

Lesbian erasure 

Lesbian erasure is the tendency to ignore, remove, falsify, or re-explain evidence of lesbian women or relationships in history, academia, the news media, and other primary sources. Lesbians may also be ignored within the LGBT community and their identity may not be acknowledged.

Trans erasure 

In 2007, Julia Serano discusses trans-erasure in the transfeminist book Whipping Girl. Serano says that transgender people are "effectively erased from public awareness" due to the assumption that everyone is cisgender (non-transgender) or that transgender identification is rare. The notion of transgender erasure has been backed up by later studies.

Asexual erasure

Intersex erasure 
Intersex and transgender individuals are often erased in public health research which conflates sex and gender (see: sex and gender distinction). The narrow and inflexible definitions of sex and gender in some countries means some intersex and non-binary people are unable to obtain accurate legal documents or identification, preventing their access to public spaces, jobs, housing, education and basic services. It is only recently that the concept of legal rights for intersex people has been considered, even in LGBTI activist circles. However, there is a growing intersex activist community which campaigns for intersex human rights, and against intersex medical interventions which they see as unnecessary and mistreatment.

See also
Heterosexism
 "LGBT erasure bill"
Non-binary discrimination
Homophobia
Biphobia
Transphobia

References

 
LGBT and society